Upshi is a village and road junction on the Leh-Manali Highway in the union territory of Ladakh in India. Gya is also to the south.

An ancient trading road (right turn while coming from Manali) heads to the east from Upshi towards Tibet. There is a helipad on this road. There is a Customs and Excise department's check post on Leh-Manali highway towards Manali after crossing the river. Goat farming is important to the local economy.

Demographics
According to the 2011 census of India, Upshi has 26 households. The effective literacy rate (i.e. the literacy rate of population excluding children aged 6 and below) is 72.65%.

See also
 Kharoo
 Geography of Ladakh
 Tourism in Ladakh

References

Villages in Kharu tehsil
Hill stations in Ladakh
Ladakh 
Geography of Ladakh